John Benjamin Watkins (June 14, 1855 – November 30, 1931) was a Democratic politician who served as a member of the Virginia Senate twice, first representing the state's 16th district, and a second time representing the 35th district, comprising Henrico, Chesterfield, New Kent, Charles City, and James City Counties and the City of Williamsburg (which he held at the time of his death).
A businessman, Senator Watkins started a nursery with his brother in Midlothian, Virginia.
John B. Watkins is the great-grandfather of Virginia State Senator John Watkins, who represents some of the same localities in the current Virginia Senate as well as continuing to operate the family nursery business.

References

External links

1855 births
1931 deaths
University of Richmond alumni
Democratic Party Virginia state senators
People from Powhatan County, Virginia
20th-century American politicians